Gurmukh Singhwala  is a village in Kapurthala district of Punjab State, India. The village is administered by a Sarpanch who is an elected representative of village as per the constitution of India and Panchayati raj (India).

Demography 
According to the report published by Census India in 2011, Gurmukh Singhwala has total number of 5 houses and population of 23 of which include 12 males and 11 females. Literacy rate of Gurmukh Singhwala is 91.30%, higher than state average of 75.84%.  The population of children under the age of 6 years is 0 which is 0.00% of total population of Gurmukh Singhwala, and child sex ratio is approximately 0, lower than state average of 846.

Population data

Air travel connectivity 
The closest airport to the village is Sri Guru Ram Dass Jee International Airport.

Villages in Kapurthala

References

External links
  Villages in Kapurthala
 Kapurthala Villages List

Villages in Kapurthala district